E-file is a system for submitting tax documents to the US Internal Revenue Service through the Internet or direct connection, usually without the need to submit any paper documents. Tax preparation software with e-filing capabilities includes stand-alone programs or websites. Tax professionals use tax preparation software from major software vendors for commercial use.

Of the 139.3 million US returns filed in 2007, 79.98 million (or about 57.4 percent) were filed electronically. In 2010, a total of 129.3 million US returns were filed, and 93.4 million were filed electronically: in three years the percentage of returns filed electronically increased to 72.3 percent of total returns. In 2018, 89% of tax returns were filed electronically.

Taxpayers can e-file free using the IRS Free File service, either using an authorized IRS e-file provider's tax software, if eligible, or by using online Free File Fillable Forms from the Free File Alliance. Prior to 2020, the use of a third party was required for IRS e-file, and it was not possible to e-file directly through the IRS website. In 2020, the IRS made direct e-filing possible through IRS Free File Fillable Forms available to taxpayers of any income level.

History
The IRS started electronic filing in 1986 to lower operating costs and paper usage. Since then, additional features have been added. In 1987 Electronic Direct Deposit was added as a form of payment. Milestones have been set and broken throughout the years. In 1990 4.2 million returns were reached and in recent years a record of 1 billion 1040's have been E-filed. E-filing originally used the processing system developed in 1969 by the IRS but, since 2003, the IRS has been developing a new enhanced processing system called CADE.

Types of e-file providers
The IRS accepts electronic submission of a variety of tax forms through their IRS Authorized e-file Providers. The IRS offers e-filing to most forms ranging from 1040's to 2290's to 990's.

Individual returns
Individuals have the option of both free and paid tax software. Recently a feature from the IRS called FreeFile allows users to file their individual tax returns for free. It is also possible to go through an authorized efile company that files Form 1040 with a service charge. FreeFile is free, it's an easy step by step system for those who make less than $64,000 annually and a more task-heavy form of filing for those who make above $64,000. For those who make more than $64,000 a year, the FreeFile is not step-by-step but an actual Form 1040 that can be filled out, box by box, electronically.

Business returns
Businesses and self-employed taxpayers can choose from a variety of commercial e-file services depending on their individual needs. Some of the forms that fall under business returns include Form 2290 (truck tax), Form 1099 (reporting payments to individuals other than employees). IRS has no set pricing for each form, so each filing company sets their own price accordingly. IRS has a list of authorized websites that do e-filing for some forms.

Tax exempt organization returns
Tax exempt organizations may file the annual information return IRS Form 990, Form 990-EZ and Form 990-N with a variety of independent tax software providers. As with the business returns, the IRS does not set prices; each e-filing company sets their own.

Authorized filers
IRS e-filer providers must be authorized by the IRS. The IRS provides a list of authorized e-file providers on some forms. The authorized providers must pass the testing every year. The IRS changes the order of the certified providers list daily for fairness.

See also
Electronic Tax Administration Advisory Committee
Electronic tax records
Free File Alliance
Refund anticipation loan
Modernized e-File

References

Internal Revenue Service
United States federal income tax
Tax software of the United States